Milan High School is a small high school located in Milan, Indiana, and is a part of the Milan Community Schools district which covers Franklin and Washington townships in eastern Ripley County.

Courses
Milan High School offers a variety of courses in the general and advanced levels. Dual-credit college classes are available as well.

Athletics
The Milan Indians compete in the Ohio River Valley Conference in the following sports:

Baseball
Basketball
Cross Country
Football
Golf
Soccer
Softball
Swimming
Tennis
Track and Field
Volleyball
Wrestling

1954 State Basketball Champions
Milan High School is most famous for its 1954 basketball team, which won the Indiana state championship against Muncie Central High School, a school ten times its size. The 1986 movie Hoosiers is based on the story of this team, which had lost in the semifinals the preceding year.

References

External links
Milan School Corporation Website

Public high schools in Indiana
Education in Ripley County, Indiana
Buildings and structures in Ripley County, Indiana